Anders Larsson, (born 3 October 1961 in Karlstad, Sweden) is a Swedish former cross-country skier representing Bondsjöhöjdens IK in club competitions during his career.

He also participated at the 1984 Olympic Winter Games in Sarajevo, finishing 39th in the 50 kilometers race. He also won Vasaloppet in 1987 and in 1982 he was awarded the Sixten Jernberg Award.

Cross-country skiing results
All results are sourced from the International Ski Federation (FIS).

Olympic Games

World Championships

World Cup

Season standings

References 

1961 births
Cross-country skiers at the 1984 Winter Olympics
Olympic cross-country skiers of Sweden
Swedish male cross-country skiers
Vasaloppet winners
Living people
Sportspeople from Karlstad